The 2002–03 Czech First League, known as the Gambrinus liga for sponsorship reasons, was the tenth season of top-tier football in the Czech Republic.

Stadia and locations

League table

Results

Top goalscorers

See also
 2002–03 Czech Cup
 2002–03 Czech 2. Liga

References 

  ČMFS statistics

Czech First League seasons
Czech
1